Sir Edward Ayscough (1596 – by 1654) was an English Member of Parliament.

He was the only surviving son of William Ayscough of South Kelsey, Lincolnshire and educated at Sidney Sussex College, Cambridge (1612). He succeeded his father in 1611 and his grandfather in 1612 and was knighted in 1613.

He was a Justice of the Peace for Lindsey, Lincolnshire from 1618 to at least 1640 and appointed High Sheriff of Lincolnshire for 1631–32. He was elected MP for Lincoln in 1621 and 1628 and as knight of the shire (MP) for Lincolnshire in November, 1640. As a devout Puritan he opposed the Forced Loan (a demand by Charles I that people "lend" him money) in 1627 and was briefly dismissed from the bench and imprisoned. He was an active supporter of the Parliament during the Civil War.

He married Frances, the daughter and heiress of Sir Nicholas Clifford of Bobbing Court, Kent, with whom he had 7 sons and 6 daughters. He was succeeded by his son Edward Ayscough, also an MP.

References

 

 
 
 

1596 births
Alumni of Sidney Sussex College, Cambridge
High Sheriffs of Lincolnshire
1650s deaths
English MPs 1621–1622
English MPs 1628–1629
English MPs 1640–1648